"Brightside" is a song by Swedish electropop duo Icona Pop. It was written by Frederic Kennett, Joni Fatora, Mr. Rogers, and Icona Pop, while being produced by Kennett and Rogers. It was released on 21 October 2016, through TEN Music Group, Atlantic Records and Warner Music Group.

Track listing

Credits and personnel
Credits adapted from Genius.
 Icona Pop – composing, vocals
 Mr. Rogers - composing, producing
 Frederic Kennett - composing, producing
 Joni Fatora - composing
 Delbert Bowers - mixing
 Chris Gehringer - mastering

Charts

References

2016 singles
2016 songs
Icona Pop songs
Songs written by Aino Jawo
Atlantic Records singles
Songs written by Caroline Hjelt